Sir Charles Abney Hastings, 2nd Baronet (1 October 1792 – 30 July 1858) of Willesley Hall, Derbyshire was both High Sheriff of Derbyshire and an MP for Leicester from 1826 to 1831.

Biography
Abney-Hastings was the elder son of General Sir Charles Hastings, 1st Baronet, by the daughter and heir of Thomas Abney Esq. He was born in 1792, probably in Willesley and succeeded his father in 1823, assuming, after his maternal grandfather, the additional name of Abney before that of Hastings, by Royal Licence 1 December 1823. It was a condition of an Abney ancestor that whoever received the manors took up the surname Abney. Sir Charles was High Sheriff of Derbyshire in 1825 and was MP for Leicester from 1826 to 1831.

Charles' brother, Frank Abney Hastings, who might have inherited the title or fathered an heir, died a hero in 1828 at Zante.

Hastings died on 30 July 1858, aged 66. By a deed of settlement executed about 1846 the Blackfordby and Packington estates of Sir Charles passed to Henry Rawdon-Hastings, 4th Marquess of Hastings. Willesley Hall and its estate were left to Lady Edith Maud Rawdon-Hastings, later Countess of Loudoun, the Marquess' eldest sister and wife of Charles Frederick Clifton Esq. 

Charles Frederick Clifton and his wife assumed by Act of Parliament in 1859 the surname and arms of Abney-Hastings. This was required by the conditions of Charles Abney Hastings' will.   His will required that this name change should be done by "sanction of Queen, Lords and Commons namely by an Act of Parliament".

References

1792 births
1858 deaths
Place of death missing
Baronets in the Baronetage of the United Kingdom
People from Derbyshire (before 1897)
Members of the Parliament of the United Kingdom for English constituencies
UK MPs 1826–1830
UK MPs 1830–1831
High Sheriffs of Derbyshire
Charles Abney-Hastings, 2nd Baronet